The 1916 United States presidential election in Rhode Island  took place on November 7, 1916, as part of the 1916 United States presidential election which was held throughout all contemporary 48 states. Voters chose five representatives, or electors to the Electoral College, who voted for president and vice president. 

Rhode Island was won by the Republican nominee, U.S. Supreme Court Justice Charles Evans Hughes of New York, and his running mate Senator Charles W. Fairbanks of Indiana. They defeated Democratic nominees, incumbent Democratic President Woodrow Wilson and Vice President Thomas R. Marshall. Hughes won the state by a narrow margin of 5.08%.

This was the first election since 1892 where the Democratic candidate earned more than 40% in at least one Rhode Island county. As of the 2020 United States presidential election, it is also the most recent election where the Democratic candidate lost Rhode Island but won the presidency.

Results

Results by town

See also
 United States presidential elections in Rhode Island

References

Rhode Island
1916
1916 Rhode Island elections